Rawson Department may refer to:

Rawson Department, Chubut
Rawson Department, San Juan

Department name disambiguation pages